Senator Stewart may refer to:

Members of the Northern Irish Senate
Kennedy Stewart (Northern Ireland politician) (1883–1964), Northern Irish Senator from 1945 to 1955
William Stewart (Northern Ireland senator) (1910/1911–1979), Northern Irish Senator from 1957 to 1973

Members of the United States Senate
David W. Stewart (1887–1974), U.S. Senator from Iowa from 1926 to 1927
David Stewart (Maryland politician) (1800–1858), U.S. Senator from Maryland from 1849 to 1850
Donald Stewart (Alabama politician) (born 1940), U.S. Senator from Alabama from 1978 to 1981
John Wolcott Stewart (1825–1915), U.S. Senator from Vermont in 1908
Tom Stewart (1892–1972), U.S. Senator from Tennessee from 1939 to 1949
William Morris Stewart (1827–1909), U.S. Senator from Nevada from 1865 to 1875

United States state senate members
Alva Stewart (1821–1889), Wisconsin State Senate
Charles Stewart (Harris County politician) (1836–1895), Texas State Senate
Daniel Stewart (Brigadier General) (1761–1829), Georgia State Senate
Edwin C. Stewart (1864–1921), New York State Senate
Eric Stewart (politician) (born 1971), Tennessee State Senate
Jacob H. Stewart (1829–1884), Minnesota State Senate
James Stewart (North Carolina politician) (1775–1821), North Carolina State Senate
Jimmy Stewart (politician) (born 1969), Ohio State Senate
John Stewart (Connecticut politician) (1795–1860), Connecticut State Senate
Lispenard Stewart (1855–1927), New York State Senate
Roger Stewart (born 1931), Iowa State Senate
W. Frank Stewart (fl. 1870s–1880s), Nevada State Senate
William J. Stewart (Pennsylvania politician) (1950–2016), Pennsylvania State Senate
William R. Stewart (1864–1958), Ohio State Senate

See also
Andrea Stewart-Cousins (born 1950), New York State Senate
Sharon Stewart-Peregoy (born 1953), Montana State Senate
Senator Stuart (disambiguation)